Mueang Amnat Charoen is the capital district (amphoe mueang) of Amnat Charoen province, northeastern Thailand.

History
Originally Amnat Charoen was a mueang under Mueang Khemarat. In the Thesaphiban administrative reforms around 1900 it was reassigned to Ubon Ratchathani and converted into a district. It was later named Bung after the central tambon. In 1939 it was renamed Amnat Charoen. In 1993 the new province Amnat Charoen was created, and the district was then renamed Mueang Amnat Charoen.

Geography
Neighboring districts are (from the north clockwise): Senangkhanikhom, Pathum Ratchawongsa, Phana, Lue Amnat, and Hua Taphan of Amnat Charoen Province, and Pa Tio and Thai Charoen of Yasothon province.

Administration
The district is divided into 19 sub-districts (tambons), which are further subdivided into 213 villages (mubans). The town (thesaban mueang) Amnat Charoen covers parts of the tambon Bung. Nam Plik is a sub-district municipality (thesaban tambon) which covers parts of the same-named tambon. Na Wong, Na Mo Ma, and Na Yom are sub-district municipalities which cover the full same-named subdistricts. There are a further 16 tambon administrative organizations (TAO).

References

External links

amphoe.com

Mueang Amnat Charoen